Ben Derbyshire is a British architect. He is the current chair of HTA Design LLP and a former president of the Royal Institute of British Architects.

Derbyshire joined HTA Design in 1976 and has been a co-owner since 1986. HTA Design LLP are designers and place-makers in the built environment with over 250 interdisciplinary team members working from studios in London, Manchester, Bristol and Edinburgh. HTA's purpose is making great places for people to live and creating a great place for our team of architects, planners, urban designers, landscape architects, graphic
designers, interior designers and sustainability consultants to work. Ben's current role as chair includes priorities on the practice's internal design review processes and leading its marketing effort.

Ben is a Commissioner of Historic England, the public body that helps people care for, enjoy and celebrate England's spectacular historic environment. He serves on their London Advisory Committee, High Streets Heritage Action Zone Board.

Ben is on the governing body of WCCA Worshipful Company of Chartered Architects, a modern livery company of the City of London. WCCA exists to promote quality architecture in the City of London and the architectural profession globally.

Derbyshire is President of the London Forum of Amenity and Civic Societies which represents the views and interests of over 100 amenity and civic societies in London on issues of Planning, Development Management, Heritage, Transport, Environment, Waterways and Open Spaces that are important for those who work and live in London.

The RIBA is a global professional membership body driving excellence in architecture, serving its members and society in order to deliver better buildings and places, stronger communities and a sustainable environment. Ben oversaw fundamental change in the financing and governance of the institute and the instigation of policies in relation to climate action, professional competence and codes of conduct. In September 2017, he succeeded Jane Duncan as RIBA president, a role he held for two years before being succeeded by Alan Jones. Derbyshire was the RIBA's 76th president.

References

20th-century British architects
21st-century British architects
Living people
Year of birth missing (living people)
Place of birth missing (living people)
Presidents of the Royal Institute of British Architects